Stuart Neil is professor of virology at King's College London. He is a Wellcome Trust Principal Research Fellow, and heads the Infectious Diseases department at King's College.  

He is a graduate of the University of Warwick (BSc 1997) and holds a Ph.D. (2001). from University College London.

He is the recipient of numerous grants for research on SARS-CoV-2, HIV, and Ebola virus.

References 

Living people
Year of birth missing (living people)
Virologists
Academics of King's College London

Alumni of the University of Warwick
Alumni of University College London